Anorus is a genus of soft-bodied plant beetles in the family Dascillidae. There are at least three described species in Anorus.

Species
These three species belong to the genus Anorus:
 Anorus arizonicus Blaisdell, 1934
 Anorus parvicollis Horn, 1894
 Anorus piceus LeConte, 1859

References

Further reading

 
 

Polyphaga
Articles created by Qbugbot